Bailey Creek is an  stream in the U.S. state of Virginia.

See also
List of rivers of Virginia

References

USGS Hydrologic Unit Map - State of Virginia (1974)

Rivers of Virginia
Tributaries of the James River
Rivers of Prince George County, Virginia
Rivers of Richmond, Virginia